Forges is a village of Wallonia and a district of the municipality of Chimay, located in the province of Hainaut, Belgium. 

It was a municipality of its own until January 1, 1977. 

The Trappist abbey Notre-Dame de Scourmont and the source of the river Oise are located near Forges.

References

Former municipalities of Hainaut (province)
Chimay